The Zammarini is a tribe of cicadas. They are native to the Americas, especially the Neotropics.

There are about 12 genera and at least 60 described species in Zammarini.

Genera include:
 Borencona Davis, 1928
 Chinaria Davis, 1934
 Daza Distant, 1905
 Juanaria Distant, 1920
 Miranha Distant, 1905
 Odopoea Stål, 1861
 Onoralna Boulard, 1996
 Orellana Distant, 1905
 Procollina Metcalf, 1952
 Uhleroides Distant, 1912
 Zammara Amyot & Audinet-Serville, 1843
 Zammaralna Boulard & Sueur, 1996

References

 
Tibiceninae
Hemiptera tribes